The 1988–89 División de Honor de Balonmano season was the 32nd since its establishment. FC Barcelona were the defending champions, having won the previous season. A total of 16 teams contested the league, 14 of which had already contested in the 1988–89 season, and two of which were promoted from the Primera División.

Team information

League table

External links
Liga ASOBAL

1990-91
handball
handball
Spain